Mr. Kabaadi is a 2017 Indian Hindi-language comedy film, written and directed by Seema Kapoor. It is the last film of actor Om Puri.

Synopsis
Mr. Kabaadi is a satirical comedy. When a kabadiwala or a scrap dealer becomes rich he flaunts his wealth. To be like other millionaires he changes his wardrobe, tries a different accent while speaking;  expanding his business or hiding his ill-gotten wealth.

Cast
Om Puri as Channulal Surmewala
Annu Kapoor as Kallu Kabadi
Vinay Pathak as Bhuriya Madari
Sarika as Chandani
Kaashish Vohra as Sayali
Ulka Gupta as Mithi
Brijendra Kala as Rajendra Arora
Rajveer Singh as Chaman aka Katte

Production
The film is being produced by Anup Jalota, Rakesh Gupta, Dinesh Gupta of Sadhna TV and Mumbai-based businessman Om Chhangani.

Filming
In a 35 days schedule a major portion of the film was shot in September 2016 in Lucknow.

Release
The film released on 8 September 2017

References

2017 films
Indian satirical films
2010s Hindi-language films
Films set in Lucknow